Prangley is a surname. Notable people with the surname include:

David Ryder Prangley, musician with the glam punk band Rachel Stamp and as bass player for Adam Ant
Gerard A. Prangley, one of the two casualties in the Star Canopus diving accident in 1978
Trevor Prangley (born 1972), South African mixed martial artist

See also
Shark Fights 13: Jardine vs. Prangley or Shark Fights, mixed martial arts promotion based in Amarillo, Texas
Prang (disambiguation)